Patrick Perret (born 6 November 1953) is a former French racing cyclist. He rode in eight editions of the Tour de France between 1975 and 1982. His sporting career began with ASPTT Besancon.

References

External links
 

1953 births
Living people
French male cyclists
Sportspeople from La Rochelle
Cyclists from Nouvelle-Aquitaine